Joseph Francis Shortill (2 December 1894 – 22 February 1970) was an Australian rules footballer who played with Carlton and Fitzroy in the Victorian Football League (VFL).

Notes

External links

Joe Shortill's profile at Blueseum
 

1894 births
1970 deaths
Players of Australian handball
Australian rules footballers from Victoria (Australia)
Carlton Football Club players
Fitzroy Football Club players